Appunni is a 1984 Indian Malayalam-language romantic comedy film directed by Sathyan Anthikad and written by V. K. N. It is based on V. K. N.'s story Premavum Vivahavum and it is the only screenplay he has written. The film stars Nedumudi Venu in the title role, while  Mohanlal, Menaka, Bharath Gopi, and Sukumari play other lead roles.

Plot

The film explores the complicated love triangle between the characters played by Nedumudi Venu, Mohanlal and Menaka. Appunni and Ammukutty are lovers from childhood. Ammukutty's father Ayyappan Nair arranges her marriage with a rich school teacher, Menon Maashu. Ammukutty is happy to end her relationship with Appunni and marries the rich and modern Menon Maashu.

However, Menon Maashu fails to arrive on time for the marriage. Ayyappan Nair, who thought that Menon Maashu might have cheated his daughter, conducts Ammukkutty's marriage with Appunni. But, Menon Maashu arrives late at night, and now Ayyappan Nair wants Ammukutty to marry Menon Maashu. Shaken by the behaviour of her father and Menon Maashu, Ammukkutty closes the door in front of them and decides to live with Appunni.

Cast
 Mohanlal as Menon Maashu
 Nedumudi Venu as Appunni
 Menaka as Ammukutty
 Bharath Gopi as Ayyappan Nair, Ammukutty's father
 Sankaradi as Adhikari
 Bahadoor as Hajiyar
 Sukumari as Malu, Ammukutty's mother
 Oduvil Unnikrishnan as Kurup Mash
 Kuthiravattam Pappu as Karunakaran
 Meena as Menon's mother
 Kuttyedathi Vilasini as Kalyani Amma

Soundtrack
The music was composed by Kannur Rajan and the lyrics were written by Bichu Thirumala.

References

External links 
 

1980s Malayalam-language films
Films based on short fiction
Films directed by Sathyan Anthikad